Salisbury is an unincorporated community located in Sangamon County, Illinois.  It is located on Illinois Route 97, 11 miles (18 km) northwest of Springfield.  Salisbury was once located in its own rural township, Salisbury Township.  After Salisbury Township dissolved itself in 1989, the Salisbury area joined the adjacent Gardner Township, with postal addresses being assigned to the neighboring village of Pleasant Plains about seven miles to the southwest.

Notable residents 
 Evelyn Brandt Thomas, farm chemicals manufacture/distribution innovator

References

Unincorporated communities in Sangamon County, Illinois
Springfield metropolitan area, Illinois
Unincorporated communities in Illinois